John Archdall (13 January 1804 – 11 May 1897) was an Irish Anglican priest. 

Archdall was born in Wexford and educated at Trinity College, Dublin, He was ordained in 1828. He was appointed Rector of Newtownbarry in 1837 and  Archdeacon of  Ferns in 1875, holding both positions until his death

References

Alumni of Trinity College Dublin
Irish Anglicans
People from Wexford, County Wexford
Archdeacons of Ferns
1897 deaths
1804 births